Aviatour's Fly'n, Inc., operating as Aviatour, was a charter airline with its corporate headquarters in the general aviation area of Mactan–Cebu International Airport, Lapu-Lapu, Central Visayas, Philippines. It operates air taxi services and charter flights in the Visayas. Its charter service includes sightseeing tours among islands in the Visayas and Mindanao.

The company experienced two plane crashes in 2012. The first crash occurred early in 2012. One of its planes, a Cessna 172 aircraft, crashed in Mambajao, Camiguin, while flying tourists from Mactan in Cebu. A pilot and a passenger were killed in the accident. The second accident occurred on 18 August 2012 which killed 3 including Jesse Robredo.

References

Defunct airlines of the Philippines
Companies based in Lapu-Lapu City
Airlines established in 2011
Philippine companies established in 2011
Airlines disestablished in 2012
2012 disestablishments in the Philippines